Noon is an unincorporated village in Whatcom County, in the U.S. state of Washington.  A head shop is located there, along with several houses.  A number of other businesses and homes stretch along the village's surrounding highways.

The community was named after A. F. Noon.

References

Unincorporated communities in Whatcom County, Washington
Unincorporated communities in Washington (state)